Alfa: Antiterror is a strategy video game created by Russian developer MiST Land South and published by Game Factory Interactive in Russia on January 20, 2005. In the same year, the North American company Strategy First published the game as well. The story of the game follows a Russian special forces Alpha Group. The player guides the actions of the detachment of an elite squad Alpha Group to fight terrorism. Many jobs in the game are based on historical events.

References

External links 
game page on the publisher site

Further reading
 
 
 E3 2004 Preview, by IGN
 E3 2004 Impressions at GameSpot.com
 Preview at GameSpot.com
 Preview at WorthPlaying.com
 Preview at GameSpy.com
 Announcement at IGN
 Preview at ArmchairGeneral.com
 Review at Absolute Games 
 Review 2 at Absolute Games 

2005 video games
Windows games
Windows-only games
Real-time strategy video games
Video games developed in Russia
Soviet–Afghan War video games
Video games about police officers
Video games set in Russia
Video games set in Chechnya
Video games set in Afghanistan
Multiplayer and single-player video games
Russobit-M games